The men's 300 m rifle three positions was a shooting sports event held as part of the Shooting at the 1952 Summer Olympics programme. It was the sixth appearance of the event at an Olympic Games. The competition was held on 27 July 1952, with 32 shooters from 18 nations competing. Each nation was limited to two shooters. The event was won by Anatoli Bogdanov with Lev Vainshtein in third, as the Soviet Union took both gold and bronze in its debut. Between the Soviets was Robert Bürchler of Switzerland, earning silver.

Background

This was the sixth appearance of the men's 300 metre three-positions rifle event, which was held 11 times between 1900 and 1972. Three of the top 10 shooters from 1948 returned: silver medalist Pauli Janhonen of Finland, eighth-place finisher Holger Erbén of Sweden, and tenth-place finisher Emmett Swanson of the United States. August Hollenstein of Switzerland was the 1952 world champion, with his countryman Robert Bürchler finishing third.

Brazil, Canada, Egypt, Guatemala, India, Israel, the Soviet Union, Venezuela, and Yugoslavia each made their debut in the event. Denmark and Norway each made their sixth appearance, the only nations to have competed at every appearance of the event to date; France missed the event for the first time.

Competition format

The competition had each shooter fire 120 shots, 40 shots in each of three positions: prone, kneeling, and standing. Shots were fired in series of 10. The target was 1 metre in diameter, with 10 scoring rings; targets were set at a distance of 300 metres. Thus, the maximum score possible was 1200 points. Any rifle could be used.

Records

Prior to the competition, the existing world and Olympic records were as follows.

Anatoli Bogdanov broke the Olympic record with 1123 points to win. The second-place finisher, Robert Bürchler, equalled the old record. Bürchler set a world record in the kneeling position, with 381 points.

Schedule

All times are Eastern European Summer Time (UTC+3)

Results

References

Shooting at the 1952 Summer Olympics
Men's 300m 3 positions